The Blaan people, are one of the indigenous peoples of Southern Mindanao in the Philippines. Their name could have derived from "bla" meaning "opponent" and the suffix "an" meaning "people". According to a 2021 genetic study, the Blaan people also have Papuan admixture.

Classification
The Blaan are neighbors of the T'boli, and live in Lake Sebu and T'boli municipalities of South Cotabato, Sarangani, General Santos, the southeastern part of Davao and around Lake Buluan in North Cotabato. They are famous for their brassworks, beadwork, and tabih weave. The people of these tribes wear colorful embroidered native costumes and beadwork accessories. The women of these tribes, particularly, wear heavy brass belts with brass "tassels" ending in tiny brass bells that herald their approach even when they are a long way off.

History
Some Blaan natives were displaced when General Santos was founded in 1939. Others settled in the city.

Their language is said to be the source of the name for Koronadal City, from two Blaan words – kalon meaning cogon grass and nadal or datal meaning plain, which aptly described the place for the natives. On the other hand, Marbel, which is another name for the poblacion, is a Blaan term malb-el which means "murky waters" referring to a river, now called Marbel River.

The tribe practices indigenous rituals while adapting to the way of life of modern Filipinos.

Relations with settlers and their descendants are not always harmonious; Ilonggo settlers reportedly clashed with some Blaan natives in March 2015.

Arts and culture

Language

Indigenous Blaan religion
Some of the deities in the Blaan pantheon include:
Melu – The Supreme Being and creator. He has white skin and gold teeth. He is assisted by Fiuwe and Tasu Weh.
Sawe – Joined Melu to live in the world
Fiuwe – A spirit who lived in the sky.
Diwata – A spirit who joined Fiuwe to live in the sky
Tasu Weh – The evil spirit.
Fon Kayoo – The spirit of the trees.
Fon Eel – The spirit of water.
Fon Batoo – The spirit of rocks and stones.
Tau Dilam Tana – The spirit who lives in the underworld
Loos Klagan – The most feared deity, uttering his name is considered a curse.

Weaving tradition 
The Blaans have a system of weaving using abaca fiber.

Blaan weavers do not use spinning wheels. Instead, they join together by hand strands of the abaca fiber, which are then used to weave the tabih.

Fu Yabing Dulo was one of two surviving master designers left of the  art of  weaving.

Brass and copper work and beadwork 
The Blaan have a tradition of creating art from brass and copper. The Blaan smelt brass and copper to produce small bells and handles of long knives. These knives, called the fais, are made with intricately designed brass.

References

External links
Pictures of a Blaan musical instrument
"Blaan natives set up upland rice museum"

Indigenous peoples of the Philippines
Ethnic groups in Mindanao